The 2012–13 season was Blackburn Rovers' 125th season as a professional football club. It was their first season back in the Football League Championship after an 11-year run in the Premier league English football.

Despite relegation the new season began with the owners backing Steve Kean. There were many signings in the summer, the most notable one being the signing of Jordan Rhodes for £8 million. The fee was a record transfer for a championship team and shattered the previous transfer record.

Summary

Rovers started the season with four wins in the first six games. Their first defeat came in their seventh game against Middlesbrough at Ewood Park.  Their performance in that game piled on intense pressure and speculation against Kean.

A week later, after Kean had travelled with the players to the capital on Friday for the game against Charlton, he attended a press conference in the afternoon, but news came at 7pm that he had resigned. Rumours suggested alleged outside interference. He described his position 'untenable' and no longer prepared to carry on as manager.

The sudden and unexpected nature of Kean's departure meant assistant manager Eric Black was the obvious choice for caretaker. Rovers started slowly under the temporary boss waiting four games before the first win. However, Rovers did manage to collect eight points and three clean sheets.

The search for a new manager took the Rovers board an entire month before finally opting for former Rovers defender Henning Berg. The choice of an out-of-work manager and football pundit for Norwegian TV surprised many who were calling for an experienced and a big name manager.

Berg's reign began with disappointment, his debut game against Crystal Palace marked the end of Blackburn's unbeaten away run. His solitary victory came at Peterborough; the same match saw Jordan Rhodes's first hat-trick for Rovers. Rovers were unlucky under Berg, especially against Huddersfield and Burnley when they succumbed to late equalisers. The team began to lack confidence and it showed in their results.

During Berg's ten games in charge Rovers lost six times, dropping from the play-offs spots to 17th place, the poor run of form forced the owners to sack the manager and the coaching staff a day later on Boxing Day.

After the sacking Reserve team coach Gary Bowyer and Youth coach Terry McPhillips took on the reigns and under caretaker management Rovers started brightly, helping Rovers gain a win over Barnsley which ended Rovers six match winless run, while their second win over Nottingham Forest ended an eleven-game run without a clean sheet. Rovers carried on the momentum into the FA cup with a win over Bristol City.

On Wednesday 9 January. Derek Shaw confirmed Rovers's interest in Blackpool manager Michael Appleton despite an announcement a week earlier from global adviser that a move for a new manager would be put on hold till the end of January. Just before Friday evening fixture Rovers named Michael Appleton as the manager. Bowyer's brief spell in charge remained unbeaten as they finished the game against Wolves with a draw.

Appleton took training on the Monday and wasted no time bring in his own staff, choosing Ashley Westwood as the assistant manager and John Keeley as goalkeeping coach. Appleton's tenure started badly with a loss to Charlton which wasn't a good spectacle. Rovers started slowly and the poor atmosphere partly blamed by the presence of the Venky's who had visited Ewood Park to watch the game. Rovers conceded first, but failed to establish control despite pulling a goal back from Jordan Rhodes, Charlton quickly retook the lead and the game finished 2–1 to the away team.

Michael Appleton's second game was much more encouraging, they were destined to win the game until a clumsy foul by substitute David Goodwillie after injury time resulted in a penalty, Brighton duly converted the penalty and snatched an unlikely draw in front of 12,230, lowest crowd at Ewood park in the league. At the third attempt, Rovers managed their first victory under Appleton with a conclusive 3–0 win over Derby County in the 4th round of the FA cup. Appleton's first win at Ewood Park occurred in the following match, 2–0 victory over Bristol City.

Appleton used the January transfer window as an opportunity to trim the squad, at least 10 players were either released or moved out on loan. Rovers missed out on the permanent transfer of DJ Campbell at the last minute, but managed to secure him on a loan agreement, later in February Man City youth defender Karim Rekik and former Rover David Bentley joined the squad.  Rovers win over Ipswich saw Jordan Rhodes score for the seventh successive game, a record only achieved by four Rovers players. Rhodes could have extended the run to eight games if it were for the referee not awarding a penalty for a blatant handball by Brighton defender el-Abd.

In the next game Rovers produced one of the shocks of the FA cup with a 1–0 win over Arsenal, they came into the game as clear under-dogs and kept under sustained pressure throughout the game, but forward Kazim Richards strike on 72 minutes put Rovers into the lead, the team fought on to secure a famous victory at the Emirates for the first time.

Rovers experienced their first defeat in 7 outings in the following game against Hull. More defeats followed against Leicester, Peterborough and Bolton, the point they picked up in that period was a scoreless draw to Leeds. Rovers carried on the poor run of results into the FA cup losing out in a replay with Millwall. In the east Lancashire derby against Burnley, Rovers stole a point with a last gasp strike deep into stoppage time scored by David Dunn.

On 19 March 2013 after 67 days in charge of the club Michael Appleton was sacked as manager of the club. following the second sacking of the season Gary Bowyer resumed caretaker manager for the second time.

Rovers winless run extended to 11 games as they were beaten 3–0 at Cardiff before slipping to a 3–2 loss at Sheffield Wednesday. The Hillsborough defeat put Rovers in the Championship's bottom three and left fans with deep fears of a second successive relegation.

Many supporters were then left puzzled as Gary Bowyer was asked to travel to India with Paul Agnew and Derek Shaw to meet the owners ahead of a crucial home game against Derby. But Bowyer returned saying reassurances he had received from the owners would help the squad, and Rovers beat Derby 2–0 before following that up with victory over Huddersfield.

A 4–0 loss at Watford kept them in the mix but then followed a comeback triumph at Millwall that put Rovers five points away from the relegation zone with only two games left to play. A home draw against Crystal Palace then left them effectively safe.

But there remained issues off the field, with internal problems played out in court during Henning Berg's £2.25m claim against the club. Berg won the case, but before that Rovers' own lawyers admitted the club was 'out of control' and 'a shambles'.

They added that Shaw was operating without the authority of the owners and was subject to a disciplinary investigation over Berg's contract. Rovers finished the season in 17th place in the Championship after a 1–1 draw at Birmingham on the final day. Jordan Rhodes netted again but his tally of 29 league goals left him one behind Championship top scorer Glenn Murray, of Crystal Palace.

Rovers finished four points clear of the bottom three, but three points adrift of Burnley.  Off the field Derek Shaw and secretary Ian Silvester travelled to India to meet the owners, but Shaw's future remained unclear after the talks. Both returned to England and went back to work as normal.

Division stats

League table

Split table

Fixtures and results

Pre-season friendlies

 Pre-season game against N.E.C. on 5 August 2012 at Stadion de Goffert cancelled due to fan unrest. However behind closed doors training match played ending 0–0. It has since been confirmed Rovers fans were not involved and had been an issue with Dutch fans.

Championship
All results are from the BBC's website.

 August 

 September 

 October 

 

 November 

 December 

{{football box collapsible
|date = 22 December 2012
|round = 
|time = <small>match postponed due to waterlogged pitch</small>
|team1 = Blackburn Rovers
|score = P – P 
|team2 = Brighton & Hove Albion
|goals1 =
|goals2 =
|stadium = 
|attendance = 
|result = P
}}

 January 

 February 

 March 

 April 

 May 

Match by Match

Football League Cup

FA Cup

Club

Technical staff

Medical staff

Squad statistics

Appearances and goals

|-
|colspan="14"|Players that played for Blackburn Rovers this season that have left the club:''

|}

Assists

Penalties

For (8)

Against (7)

Managerial changes

Transfers

Summer

In

 Total spent  ~ £12,500,000 + Undisclosed fees

Out

 Total sold  ~ £9,000,000 + Undisclosed fees

Loan in

Loan out

January

In

 Total spent  ~ Undisclosed fee

Out

 Total sold  ~ £0

Loan in

Emergency Loans

Loan out

References

External links
Blackburn Rovers F.C. official website

2012-13
2012–13 Football League Championship by team